Live at the North Sea Jazz Festival, 1980 is a 1980 album by Oscar Peterson, accompanied by Joe Pass, Toots Thielemans and Niels-Henning Ørsted Pedersen.

Track listing
 "Caravan" (Duke Ellington, Irving Mills, Juan Tizol) – 11:21
 "Straight, No Chaser" (Thelonious Monk) – 8:54
 "There's No You" (Tom Adair, Hal Hopper) – 6:35
 "You Stepped Out of a Dream" (Nacio Herb Brown, Gus Kahn) – 7:19
 "City Lights" (Oscar Peterson) – 6:36
 "I'm Old Fashioned" (Jerome Kern, Johnny Mercer) – 6:10
 "A Time for Love" (Johnny Mandel, Paul Francis Webster) – 7:17
 "Bluesology" (Milt Jackson) – 6:57
 "Goodbye" (Gordon Jenkins) – 8:13
 "There Is No Greater Love" (Isham Jones, Marty Symes) – 8:14

Personnel

Performance
 Oscar Peterson – piano
 Toots Thielemans – harmonica
 Niels-Henning Ørsted Pedersen – double bass
 Joe Pass – guitar

References

Oscar Peterson live albums
Albums produced by Norman Granz
1980 live albums
Pablo Records live albums